Ian Charles Boucher Taylor (born 24 September 1954) is a former England field hockey goalkeeper. He is also the chief executive of SkillsActive, and also became CEO of London Irish Holdings, improving the on and off field activities of the Rugby Club.

He was a member of the gold winning Great Britain squad in the 1988 Summer Olympics in Seoul, during which he was a teacher at Bromsgrove School. Four years earlier he won Bronze at the 1984 Summer Olympics in Los Angeles. He also won silver with the England squad at the 1986 Hockey World Cup. In the European Cup with the England squad he won silver in 1987 and bronze in 1978.

Taylor has held a number of honorary roles within sports administration including Minister’s nominee on the Sports Council (with a UK remit), director of the GB ice hockey Board and a director of the British Olympic Association. He was also a commentator for BBC Sport between 1988-1996. He was previously the chief executive for sportscotland, following the departure of Ian Robson in July 2004. He was also the short lived CEO of the Greyhound Board of Great Britain but resigned over a policy introduced under his tenure that saw the pooling of samples.

Taylor was born in Bromsgrove, England, and was a student at Borough Road College, Isleworth, London. He returned to the college on several occasions to lecture and coach hockey. He has played club hockey for East Grinstead Hockey Club.

References

External links
 

1954 births
Living people
Sportspeople from Bromsgrove
English male field hockey players
English Olympic medallists
Olympic field hockey players of Great Britain
Olympic gold medallists for Great Britain
Olympic bronze medallists for Great Britain
Field hockey players at the 1984 Summer Olympics
Field hockey players at the 1988 Summer Olympics
Sport in Scotland
Olympic medalists in field hockey
Medalists at the 1988 Summer Olympics
Medalists at the 1984 Summer Olympics
People in greyhound racing
East Grinstead Hockey Club players